The following is a list of chairmen of Football Club Internazionale Milano.

History 
The first president of Inter Milan history was Giovanni Paramithiotti, who was also one of the founders of the club. Paramithiotti was succeeded by Ettore Strauss just one year later following a decision from the club's associates. 

The longest-running presidency was Massimo Moratti's, who bought the club from Ernesto Pellegrini in 1995. Moratti served non-continuously as president from 1995 to 1913, with two resignations in the process: firstly in May 2009, revoked the following July, and secondly from January 2004 to November 2006, where the role was given to Giacinto Facchetti until his death.

Massimo Moratti's presidency was also the most victorious in the history of the club, winning 16 trophies from 1998 to 2011 including five Serie A titles, four Coppa Italia, three Supercoppa Italiana, one UEFA Cup, one Champions League, and one FIFA Club World Cup. The second most victorious presidency was that of Massimo Moratti's father, Angelo, who was at the head of the club from 1955 to 1968, winning three Serie A titles, two Champions Leagues, and two Intercontinental Cups.

Moratti's era concluded in 2013, when the club was bought by Indonesian businessman Erik Thohir, who became the first foreign president of Inter Milan. In 2018, Thohir sold the club to Steven Zhang, who became the youngest-ever president of the club as well as the only foreign president to win a trophy.

List of chairmen

References

External links
List of Inter Milan chairmen at Inter.it

Chairmen
 List
Chairmen